Kevin Petrecca  is a neurosurgical oncologist, currently chief of the Department of Neurosurgery at the McGill University Health Centre and appointed as the William Feindel Chair in Neuro-Oncology at McGill University in Montreal, Quebec, Canada.

Biography 
He is originally from Niagara Falls, Ontario.

He holds both a Doctor of Medicine (M.D.) and a Doctor of Philosophy (Ph.D.), in addition to being certified as a fellow of the Royal College of Physicians and Surgeons of Canada in neurosurgery and oncology.

He is currently an attending neurosurgical oncologist at the Montreal Neurological Institute and Hospital within the McGill University Health Centre, in addition to being the chief of the Department of Neurosurgery. He dedicates his practice to treating brain cancer patients, particularly those with glioblastoma.

He also holds an appointment as associate professor in the Department of Neurology and Neurosurgery at McGill University.

His clinical and academic careers supplement his family life with his wife Myriam Douville and their three kids Sarah, Élodie, and Loic.

Research 
His research focuses mostly on the treatment of brain cancers, particularly glioblastoma, which typically do not respond to conventional cancer treatments.

References

Internal link 
 William Feindel

Living people
Year of birth missing (living people)
Academic staff of McGill University